Nadezhda Shitikova (15 September 1923 – 1995) was a Soviet fencer. She competed in the women's individual foil event at the 1952 and 1956 Summer Olympics.

References

External links
 

1923 births
1995 deaths
Russian female foil fencers
Soviet female foil fencers
Olympic fencers of the Soviet Union
Fencers at the 1952 Summer Olympics
Fencers at the 1956 Summer Olympics